Mauricio Ortega may refer to:

Mauricio Ortega (cyclist) (born 1980), Colombian road cyclist
Mauricio Ortega (discus thrower) (born 1994), Colombian discus thrower

See also
Mauricio (given name)
Ortega